Marilyn Clement (June 30, 1935 – August 3, 2009) served as the Executive Director of the Center for Constitutional Rights from 1976 to 1989.  She founded Healthcare NOW!

References
https://web.archive.org/web/20091001045944/http://www.healthcare-now.org/marilyn-clement/
https://web.archive.org/web/20110605025834/http://www.michaelmoore.com/words/latestnews/index.php?id=14288
https://web.archive.org/web/20100818005251/http://atlantaprogressivenews.com/news/0489.html
https://web.archive.org/web/20091008050312/http://partnership4coverage.ny.gov/hearings/2007-09-05/testimony/docs/marilyn_clement_-_healthcare_now_coalition.pdf

1935 births
2009 deaths
Activists from New York City